The coutilier (also coutillier, coustillier) was a title of a low-ranking professional soldier in Medieval French armies.  A coutilier was a member of the immediate entourage of a French knight or a squire called lances fournies. The presence of the coutilier is first recorded in a French Ordinance of 1445. The coutilier also had a place in the Burgundian army of Charles the Bold, being described in detail the military regulations of 1473.  Coutiliers are also mentioned in the Breton military regulations of March 1450.

Equipment
The name coutilier seems to derive from their being equipped with a long knife or short sword called a coustille. According to Ewart Oakeshott, the term originally meant a type of infantryman or brigand. However, by the time detailed descriptions appear in the mid-15th century, the coutilier is clearly a lightly armoured horseman. A French coutilier of 1446 was equipped with a helmet, leg armour, a haubergeon, jack or brigandine, a dagger, sword and either a demilance or a voulge. The equipment of a Burgundian coutilier in 1473 is almost identical, with the substitution of a javelin for the demi-lance or voulge (javelin here meaning a light spear, not a throwing weapon).  His horse should be worth at least 30 écus.

References

military ranks of France
military units and formations of France
military units and formations of the Hundred Years' War
military units and formations of the Middle Ages